Sandra Petrović Jakovina (born 21 March 1985 is a Croatian Member of the European Parliament following the accession of Croatia to the European Union in 2013.

Jakovina is the youngest MEP for the Social Democratic Party of Croatia (SDP). Her husband is Tihomir Jakovina, Minister of Agriculture in the Cabinet of Zoran Milanović, and also a member of the SDP.

She has spoken against tax evasion.

References

1985 births
Living people
Social Democratic Party of Croatia politicians
MEPs for Croatia 2013–2014
Social Democratic Party of Croatia MEPs
Women MEPs for Croatia